The Rights and Justice Party (Turkish: Hak ve Adalet Partisi, abbreviated HAP) is a political party in Turkey led by Yiğit Zeki Öztürk since 2012. The party describes itself as a Turkish nationalist organisation that rejects the traditional left-right political scale. The party states that it is open to negotiations and alliances with any party.

In the presidential election of 2014, the HAP supported the opposition candidate Ekmeleddin İhsanoğlu.

References

2012 establishments in Turkey
Centrist parties in Turkey
Nationalist parties in Turkey
Political parties established in 2012
Political parties in Turkey
Populist parties